The Cleveland Velodrome is an open-air velodrome in Cleveland, Ohio, U.S. The  track has 50 degree banked turns. The track opened in August 2012. For the 2018 season, the track was renovated.

References 

Cycling in Ohio
Sports venues in Ohio

Buildings and structures in Cleveland
Tourist attractions in Cleveland
Velodromes in the United States